Floriana ( or Il-Floriana), also known by its title Borgo Vilhena, is a fortified town in the South Eastern Region area of Malta, just outside the capital city Valletta. It has a population of 2,205 as of March 2014. Floriana is the birthplace of many famous Maltese, amongst which the composer of the national anthem, 'L-Innu Malti', Robert Samut; former Bishop of Malta Dun Mauro Caruana, the poets Oliver Friggieri and Maria Grech Ganado, the writer and politician Herbert Ganado and Swedish Idol winner Kevin Borg.

Etymology
Floriana is named after Pietro Paolo Floriani, an Italian military engineer who designed the Floriana Lines, the line of fortifications surrounding the town. In Maltese, the town is called Il-Floriana by the local council. However, it is popularly known as Il-Furjana, and the latter is regarded as the official name by the National Council for the Maltese Language. Government sources use both variants.

The town's original official name was Borgo Vilhena (or Subborgo Vilhena) after Grand Master António Manoel de Vilhena, but the name fell out of use in favour of Floriana or Furjana. The name Borgo Vilhena is now used as a title, just like Valletta has the title Città Umilissima.

History

The origins of Floriana go back to 1636, when construction of the Floriana Lines commenced. The line of fortifications was built outside the fortifications of Valletta as an outer defensive line for the capital city. The lines were named after Pietro Paolo Floriani, the Italian military engineer who had designed them. The fortifications were partially defensible by 1640, but construction and modifications continued throughout the 17th and 18th century, being fully completed in the 1720s.

The area between the Floriana Lines and the Valletta Land Front began to be built up in 1724, when Grand Master António Manoel de Vilhena founded the suburb Borgo Vilhena.

The New Suburb 1700-1800

The new suburb, in 1746, consisted of twenty residen- tial blocks, which were arranged on both sides of St. Anne's Street and also of the church of St. Publius which was to the north of the residen- tial area. By the mid-eighteenth century the suburb had un- dergone some expansion, with Montgomery House built in 1730 as a country house for the Grandmaster of the time. Also during this time, under the orders of the Grandmaster, there were two Welfare Institu- tions built: one was the Ospizio (1732) and the other was the Conservatorio (1734). The Argotti gardens were also laid out (1741) and the trend of Religious buildings located in Floriana continued with the building of the Chapel of St. Calcedonius, dedicated in 1743, which became part of the new Seminary in 1751, (Tonna, 1979). Four new residential blocks were also laid out around the Seminary soon after.

At this time, the Knights were still in control of Malta and it was under their supervision that Floriana developed. The new gardens and buildings made Floriana a spacious and attractive suburb and a welcome contrast to the dense buildings and population of Valletta.

In 1806, 25 soldiers who had participated in the Froberg mutiny were executed at the Floriana parade ground.

Floriana in the time of the British

The British developed Floriana as a garrison town and during the nineteenth century they built several barracks within it and took over large buildings for military use. It was during this period that the Lintorn Barracks, Casemate Barracks and St. Francis Barracks were built. In this period, that is at around 1857, a school was built and there was also the development of port facilities along the wharfs on both sides of the peninsula.

In the early twentieth century, several gardens were laid out. These were the Rundle (1915), the Kalkara Gardens (1927), Luigi Preziosi (1930) and King George the Fifth. The playing fields and the hospital were also built.

Sports
The Assoċjazzjoni Sport Floriana, or Floriana Sports Association, sponsors a number of sports in the town, as well as hosting the Floriana Supporters Club.  Sporting clubs include: 
Floriana Football Club which was the most successful football club in Malta of the 20th century
Floriana Amateur Football Club
Floriana Basketball Club
Klabb Boċċi Floriana (trans.: Floriana Bocce Club)
Young Stars Hockey Club
Floriana AFC

The Vikings Sailing Club is also located in Floriana, though it is not associated with the Sports Association.

Patron saint
Saint Publius is one of the patron saints of Malta and also the patron saint of Floriana.  The Archipresbyteral Church of Floriana is dedicated to Saint Publius, traditionally acclaimed as the first Bishop of Malta.

According to Maltese folklore, Publius supposedly lived in Malta and at one point received the Apostle Paul after the shipwreck in 60 A.D..

Publius is considered as the first Maltese saint and thus the devotion he enjoys among locals.

Pope John Paul II spoke at St. Publius Square during his two visits to Malta, and on his second visit he held the beatification of three Maltese:
Saint Ġorġ Preca (founder of the Society of Christian Doctrine)
Nazju Falzon 
Maria Adeodata Pisani

Main sights

St. Publius Parish Church
St. Publius Square, including the Granaries
The Mall Gardens
The Floriana Lines, including Porte des Bombes
Wignacourt Water Tower
Sarria Church
Robert Samut Hall
The Valletta Waterfront, including the Church of the Flight into Egypt
War Memorial
Malta Memorial
King George V Recreational Grounds
Argotti Botanical Gardens
Sir Luigi Preziosi Gardens
Vilhena Gardens
Polverista
St. Philip's Garden
Herbert Ganado Gardens
Jubilee Grove (which demarcates the town from Ħamrun and Pietà) 
Msida Bastion Historic Garden, near Hay Wharf, another landmark which has been restored and reportedly contains the grave of Mikiel Anton Vassalli, an 18th-century writer and reformer who is much associated with Malta's national identity.
Hydrofoil terminal, which is very busy during summertime with daily departures to Sicily.

Village Core

Pjazza Emm. S. Tonna (E.S. Tonna Square) 
Pjazza San Kalċidonju (St. Calcidonio Square)
Triq il-Konservatorju (Conservatory Street)
Triq il-Mall (Maglio Street) 
Triq il-Miratur (Gunlayer Street) 
Triq is-Suq (Market Street)
Triq l-Argotti (Argotti Street)
Triq l-Iljun (Lion Street) 
Triq l-Isqof M. Caruana (Bishop M. Caruana Street)
Triq San Publju (St. Publius Street) 
Triq San Tumas (St. Thomas Street) 
Triq Sarria (Sarria Street)
Trejqet il-Fosos

Government

Floriana is a leading administrative centre, hosting the Ministry and Dept of Education, the Ministry for Resources and Rural Affairs, Police Headquarters and the Public Works Dept, The Licensing and Testing Office, and Land Transport Directorate of Transport Malta, as well as other financial and commercial companies spread around the former Colonial Administrative Area of Belt-is-Sebħ.  The National Audit Office along with the Department of Contracts and the Malta Environment and Planning Authority, are located in two ravelins, Notre Dame and St. Francis, respectively.

The Floriana Local Council was established in 1993 along with Malta's other local councils to administer the town. It is located at Emmanuel S. Tonna Square. The following people have served as mayor since the post was created in 1994:
Publio Agius (1994–98)
Nigel Holland (1998–2004)
John Mary Brincat (2004)
Publio Agius (2004–07)
Nigel Holland (2007–12)
Davina Sammut (2012–12)
Nigel Holland (2012–15)
Davina Sammut Hili (2015–present)

Current Councillors that are serving from 2015–19:
James Aaron Ellul (PN)
Vince Borg (PL) 
Albert de Marco (PL)
Anthony Grech Sant (PN)

Lodging and entertainment
Floriana is home to the Hotel Phoenicia, one of the oldest and most prestigious hotels on Malta, as well as the 5 star luxury Hotel; and the Grand Hotel Excelsior.

Today it holds a huge number of boutique hotels.

The annual Isle of MTV music festival has been held in Floriana since 2007.

Maltese Carnival

Floriana is the scene of the Maltese Carnival, held in St. Anne's Street in February leading up to Lent.

Climate
Floriana features a Mediterranean climate with warm, dry summers and mild, wet winters. Floriana experiences a lack of precipitation during the summer months and heavier precipitation during the winter months. Winter temperatures are moderated by the city’s proximity to the sea. As a result, Floriana enjoys mild winters, however windy in some areas. The official climate recording station in Malta is at Luqa Airport, which is a few miles inland from Floriana. The Köppen Climate Classification subtype for this climate is "Csa" (Mediterranean Climate).

Music
Vilhena Band Club (Soċjetà Filarmonika Vilhena) was founded in 1874. The first musical director of the band was Mro. Giuseppe Borg, and the first president of the Society was Baldassare Portanier.
Kevin Borg a Maltese singer and Swedish Idol 2008 winner was born in the town. He moved to Arvidsjaur, Sweden in late 2007 to live with his girlfriend and was soon cast as a contestant on the Swedish Idol series.

Floriana community services
St. Publius Parish Church, Triq Sarria (Sarria Street)
Floriana Local Council, Pjazza Emanuel S. Tonna (Emanuel S. Tonna Square)
Floriana Police Station, Triq Sant' Anna (St. Anne Street) 
Floriana Malta Labour Party Club, Triq Sant' Anna (St. Anne Street)
Floriana Partit Nazzjonalista Club, Pjazza Sant' Anna (St. Anne Square)
Sir Paul Boffa Hospital, Sqaq Ħarper (Harper Lane)
Floriana Health Centre, Triq Franġisk Saver Fenech (Frances Xavier Fenech Street)
Central Public Library, Triq Joseph J. Mangion (J.J. Mangion Street)

Zones in Floriana
Balzunetta Named after Barcelonnette in France, hence translated to " Balzunetta"
Belt il-Ħażna, limits of Blata l-Bajda
Belt-is-Sebħ 
Msida Bastions
Crown Works, limits of Blata l-Bajda 
Fuq il-Biskuttin 
Foss Horns 
Foss Notre Dame 
Ġnien tal-Milorda 
Il-Funtana ta' Tritoni (Triton Fountain (Malta))
Hay Wharf (Xatt it-Tiben)
The Granaries (Pjazza San Publju/Il-Fosos )
Il-Mall
Independence Arena (Xagħra tal-Furjana)
Jubilee Grove
Sa Maison
Sarria
Tal-Bombi
Valletta Waterfront/Pinto Wharf (Xatt ta' Pinto)
Xatt il-Kanuni

The Granaries (Pjazza San Publju - il-Fosos)

Granaries are pits dug into the ground and covered by circular stone slabs. They were primarily used for the storage of Grain. Granaries can be found throughout Valletta and Floriana. The first granaries were built by the Knights to provide for storage within the fortifications in case of a siege. As the system of storage was reliable and efficient, the British authorities copied in all details the Knights’ granaries. The Granaries proved their worth as they continued to provide grain for the starving population during World War 2. The highest grouping of granaries (a total of 76) is found here.

‘Il-Fosos’ or The Granaries and now officially named Pjazza San Publju, is also one of the largest urban open spaces in Malta and is therefore use for mass gatherings. One important gathering was held in May 1990 during the Pope John Paul II visit to Malta. During the second Papal visit on 9 May 2001, the Pope beatified three Maltese in this square, one of whom was eventually canonised (St Gorg Preca). As Malta is a predominantly Catholic country, this is considered to be an important event in Malta’s history. A third papal visit took place on 18 April 2010 by Pope Benedict XVI. The Isle of MTV summer festival is among other major events held here.

Notable people
Edwin Busuttil, politician and public figure
Oliver Friggieri, author, lecturer
Henry Frendo, historian, lecturer
Peppi Azzopardi, producer, TV Presenter
Michael Frendo, politician
Maria Grech Ganado, writer, lecturer
Robert Samut, music writer, doctor
Filippo Sciberras, politician
Kevin Borg, singer
Mauro Caruana, bishop
James Aaron Ellul, politician, journalist & presenter
Mario Xuereb, journalist & presenter
Sammy Galea, composer, musician
Dominic Galea, composer, musician
John Holland, footballer

Twin towns – sister cities
Floriana is twinned with:
 Macerata, Italy
 Rieux-Volvestre, France

References

 Quest for regeneration of Floriana 7 April 2015.

External links

Floriana Local Council 
Floriana Parish

 
Towns in Malta
Local councils of Malta
Mediterranean port cities and towns in Malta
Populated places established in 1724
1724 establishments in Malta